The Denmark national rugby union team is governed by Dansk Rugby Union and has been playing international rugby since 1949.

DRU now has nearly 2,500 members in more than 30 clubs.

The DRU Superliga is the highest tier of the national rugby union competition in Denmark. Most of the national team's players play in the local league, however a handful of them play in amateur clubs in England, Sweden and France. There are no professional players that play for Denmark.

The national side is ranked 75th in the world, as of 16 January 2023.

History
Rugby Union had been played in Denmark since 1931, but the Danish Rugby Union wasn't formed till 1950. DRU joined the Sports Confederation of Denmark in 1971 and later that year the FIRA-AER (European rugby union). In 1974 DRU co-founded the Nordic Rugby Union (now Scandinavian Rugby Union) and in 1988 DRU joined the IRB (International Rugby Board).

The Danish 1st XV (known as Drusse) participates every year in the European nation tournament (EM). In Europe below the premier rugby nations, the remaining countries are divided into six divisions, where Denmark is located in the second division.

Championship tournaments determines seeding for World Cup qualifying pools. Denmark debuted in World Cup competition in Andorra, October 1992 (1995 classification). The Danish national team reached the second round of the most recent World Cup qualifiers having never qualified fully.

Overall Record

Current squad

 Caps & age not updated.
 Head coach: Junaire Brown
 Managers: Palle Andersen & Ruben Garcia Pedersen
 Assistant coaches: Chris Adby & Rich Groom
 Physios: Lea Barfoed, Sune Hougaard Nielsen, Manuela Milanesi & Nacho Vidondo

References

External links
 Dansk Rugby Union – Official Site
 Denmark on rugbydata.com

 
Rugby union in Denmark
European national rugby union teams
Teams in European Nations Cup (rugby union)